Marc Aspland is an English photographer who works for The Times newspaper in London where he shoots sports photography.

Information
Aspland has won prizes for some of his photography including a Special Award at the 2005 Sports Photographer of the Year.

In 2014, Aspland was awarded an Honorary Fellowship of The Royal Photographic Society.

References

British photojournalists
Living people
The Times people
Year of birth missing (living people)